Andrew Joseph Galambos (AJG) (born Ifj. Galambos József András; June 28, 1924 in Hungary – April 10, 1997 in Orange County, California) was an astrophysicist and philosopher who upheld the idea of a social structure that seeks to reconcile free will, human peace, and freedom. While Galambos had much in common with his classical liberal contemporaries, his most unusual contributions concerned his theories on intellectual property.

Overview
Galambos (AJG) denoted a government as a mechanism which is to be totally free of the State, which he associated with coercion, political or otherwise.  He is noteworthy for his integration of a wide variety of scientific, economic, and historical inputs in the creation of his ideal social structure, which he termed The Natural Republic. Galambos distinguished his theory from that of Ludwig von Mises, subscribing to the same "subjective theory of value" in economics but deriving it from his own definition of property.

The libertarian author and 1996 presidential candidate of the Libertarian Party, Harry Browne wrote of Andrew Galambos after his death:
"He was an Astrophysicist exclusively, but I refer to him as 'the unknown libertarian' because he never wrote a book or appeared on national radio or TV. His renown will be limited mostly to those who came in personal contact with him. But he had a profound effect on thousands of individuals who took his courses—who in turn affected others. Undoubtedly the ripples from the stones he dropped eventually touched some of today's leading libertarians."

Early life
Galambos was born in Hungary in 1924. His father, Joseph Galambos-Brown, had been an officer in the Austro-Hungarian army in World War I and then became a highly regarded architect. After the war, Galambos' father decided to emigrate to America to avoid his son becoming "cannon fodder" in a second world war, which he saw coming. AJG's father was his first teacher, who first inculcated AJG with a liberal point of view.

Despite his father's wish to keep his son out of war, Galambos volunteered to serve in the U.S. Army during WWII. After completing his undergraduate work at City College of New York, he moved to Minnesota in 1948 where he met his future wife, Suzanne Siegel, a fellow student at the University of Minnesota. They married in 1949.

Education
Galambos earned degrees in physics from City College of New York and the University of Minnesota.

Early career
Galambos moved to Los Angeles in 1952 to work for North American Aviation. Beginning in 1958, Galambos worked in the Space Technology Laboratory (STL) division of Ramo-Wooldridge Corporation, which later became TRW Space Technology Laboratories (STL). There, Galambos worked as an astrophysicist, calculating trajectories for Atlas ICBMs before the advent of high-speed digital computers. On the side, Galambos partnered with colleague Donald H. Allen in a business known as Universal Shares, which was an insurance and securities dealership.

As Galambos' ideas on freedom and proprietary government crystallized, he became disillusioned with his work at STL, which had evolved almost exclusively to focus on the development of inter-continental ballistic missiles for military purposes. Galambos did not want to work on weapons of war.

Around 1958–1959 Galambos formulated a proposal to the director of STL, George Mueller, for a project to develop rockets for space exploration, including lunar landings. Mueller turned it down. A few years later, however, Mueller took a position with NASA where he worked on the Apollo 11 manned lunar landing project, the same type of project he had turned down when Galambos proposed it to him at STL.

In 1960, Galambos left the aerospace industry and joined the faculty of Whittier College to teach physics, astrophysics, and mathematics. While at Whittier, Galambos presented a popular extracurricular class entitled, "The Decline and Renaissance of Laissez-Faire Capitalism." He also taught previously at New York University, Brooklyn College, Stevens Institute of Technology of Hoboken, New Jersey, the University of Minnesota, and Carleton College of Northfield, Minnesota.

In 1960, Galambos traveled with his colleague, Alvin Lowi Jr., to New York City where they met with Leonard Read of the Foundation for Economic Education (FEE) who introduced them to Henry Hazlitt, Ludwig von Mises, Murray Rothbard, and Ayn Rand.

The Free Enterprise Institute 
In 1961, Galambos established The Free Enterprise Institute (FEI) which was the name he used for his teaching business. His initial course was entitled Course 100, Capitalism: The Key to Survival. He eventually taught courses on intellectual property, investments and insurance, financial planning, physics, and journalism, among others.

Galambos had an important colleague in Jay Stuart Snelson (1936–2011). Snelson was the senior lecturer for FEI from 1964 to 1978, teaching both V-50 and V-201. In large part due to Snelson's teaching, at least 20,000 individuals attended courses offered by FEI during his tenure.

Courses V-50 and V-201
Course V-50T (the "T" was for Tape) was transcribed and published as Sic Itur Ad Astra (see below). Another course, V-201, focused on mechanisms for intellectual property protection for innovators. The initial letter "V" stands for volition, meaning the act of choosing, which is a fundamental characteristic of human beings.

V-50T and V-201T are occasionally offered as tape recorded courses by The Free Enterprise Institute.

In 1999 volume one of Sic Itur Ad Astra ("This is the Way to the Stars") was first published. The book is a transcription of Course V-50. Volume two, covering course V-201, as of January 2014 has not yet been published.

Volitional science
Galambos rejected the term social science, in part because most social scientists do not employ the scientific method to test their hypotheses. Jay Snelson suggested the term "volitional science" for its implication that volition, meaning the act of choosing, is at the center of Galambos' philosophy.

In course V-50, Galambos laid out his two postulates of volitional science:
 "Postulate Number One: All volitional beings live to pursue happiness," and
 "Postulate Number Two: All concepts of happiness pursued through moral action are equally valid."
Galambos equates immoral action with coercion and defines freedom as "the societal condition wherein every individual has one hundred percent control over his own property."
Galambos derives his theory from these postulates. The essence of Course V-50 is Galambos' elaboration of his theory of volitional science and his application of that science to solve the problems of human society.

Property
Galambos' concept of property was basic to his philosophy. He defined property as a man's life and all non-procreative derivatives of his life.

Galambos taught that property is essential to a non-coercive social structure. That is why he defined freedom as follows: "Freedom is the societal condition that exists when every individual has full (100%) control over his own property." Galambos defines property as having the following elements:
 Primordial property, which is an individual's life
 Primary property, which includes ideas, thoughts, and actions
 Secondary property, which includes all tangible and intangible possessions which are derivatives of the individual's primary property.

Property includes all non-procreative derivatives of an individual's life; this means children are not the property of their parents, and also "primary property" (a person's own ideas).

Galambos emphasized repeatedly that true government exists to protect property and that the state attacks property.

For example, the state requires payment for its services in the form of taxes whether or not people desire such services. Since an individual's money is his property, the confiscation of money in the form of taxes is an attack on property. Military conscription is likewise an attack on a person's primordial property.

Intellectual property
In course V-201 Galambos focuses on primary property, which in his usage is quite similar to what has been called "intellectual property". Galambos argued that intellectual property owners should have primary control over their own ideas and over how others might use those ideas. According to Galambos, all forms of property come from a combination of "primordial property" (a person's life) and "primary property" (a person's own ideas). By using the natural resources available in the physical universe, individuals use their primordial property, guided by primary property (actions, guided by ideas, respectively) to create "secondary property".

Galambos posited that intellectual property deserved every bit as much, if not more, protection and recognition as secondary property. His rationale for this can be explained by the following example:

Few would question that Ludwig van Beethoven's music was his intellectual property and that it should be protected. Current copyright laws do protect musical compositions but only for a limited period of time. Galambos taught that protection of artistic creations should be perpetual.

While most would acknowledge Beethoven's intellectual property in the form of his musical compositions, almost everyone would deny that Isaac Newton's discovery and description of the universal law of gravitation is Newton's property. Newton's law of gravitation, as he expounded it, is no less a creation of his mind than Beethoven's 5th symphony. Beethoven created his music by his unique skill in the musical arts of composition, melody, harmony, counterpoint, and orchestration. Newton created his description of the universal law of gravitation by his unique skill in integrating the discoveries of his intellectual antecedents such as Galileo Galilei and Johannes Kepler. Furthermore, in order to work out his theory of gravitation, Newton had to utilize a new form of mathematics, the calculus, which was founded by his teacher Isaac Barrow. (Newton's contemporary, Gottfried Leibniz, developed a notation for the calculus which remains in use today.)

Galambos recognized that more than one person could create a specific new idea, including a scientific theory, independently of each other. He allowed for that in course V-201 by innovating a method to determine whether two or more innovators of the same thing are independent of each other.

In the spirit of his teaching on intellectual property, some of Galambos' students were required to acknowledge a "proprietary notice" which asked those students to pay credit (both intellectually and financially) for the information gleaned from his courses; later he required that all participants in his lectures sign a non-disclosure agreement to address their possible misunderstanding or misapplication of his ideas before he published the ideas himself. Students were allowed to take notes for their private use and most lectures were taped.

Galambos acknowledged and paid public credit to antecedent sources such as Thomas Paine's writings, as typified by Common Sense and article 4 of the Declaration of the Rights of Man and of the Citizen – "4. Liberty consists in the freedom to do everything which injures no one else; hence the exercise of the natural rights of each man has no limits except those which assure to the other members of the society the enjoyment of the same rights. These limits can only be determined by law.".

Government versus the State
Galambos defined government as "any person or organization that sells services to protect property to which the owner of the property can voluntarily subscribe." He described the term "state" as any person or organization that claims to protect property by coercing the owner of the property to use and pay for its services, claiming 'legality' as justification. According to these definitions, a government mechanism can be an insurance company that protects an individual's home from criminal activity and casualty loss such as fire or storm damage. A state is any political entity with coercive power, from a municipality to the United States of America, which Galambos predicted has to end, with the end of coercive power.

Golden Rule
Galambos explained that the positive version of the Golden Rule ("Do unto others as you would have them do unto you") was problematic because it implied that it was acceptable for person A to "meddle" in the affairs of another provided person A would likewise appreciate the same thing done "unto" him/her. Galambos instead preferred the double negative version of the Golden Rule as the foundation for his philosophy. The double negative version is: "Do not do unto others as you would not have them do unto you." Galambos explained that this version is "not subject to meddlesome interpretation."

Evolution of Galambos' philosophy
Early in his career, Galambos supported Barry Goldwater's candidacy for the Republican nomination as president in 1960. However, as Galambos' understanding of the destruction and violence caused by the political state deepened, he ultimately rejected politics as a means of solving social problems. He instead advocated proprietary, profit-seeking companies as the best means for protection of all forms of property. He supported private property protection and defense, the absolute rights of the owner of private property, and was opposed to political voting and other forms of political activism.

Galambos's first lectures given in 1961 focused on limited government. His early societal models were modified versions of the United States republic, with the addition of the "Resistor," a body empowered to repeal laws passed by Congress if it judged them to be contrary to the Constitution."

Beginning around 1963, Galambos modified his lectures as a result of exposure to ideas from several of his contemporaries.
Through his student, engineer Charles Estes and others including his colleague Alvin Lowi, Galambos came into contact with the ideas of Robert LeFevre, who advocated the idea that the state was absurd at best, and was actually an enemy of human freedom.

Whereas Galambos highlighted in his lectures the state's abysmal performance in protecting life and property, Peter Bos (a colleague of Lowi who attended FEI lectures) suggested that insurance companies could replace the state in this vital role. Bos and Galambos envisioned a broader concept of insurance than the word implies to most people. In his lectures, Galambos theorized that insurance could include not only reimbursement for loss, but also prevention of loss, detection of individuals who cause loss, and the seeking of restitution from such individuals.

Charles Estes had innovated an idea of restitution-based justice and a private, non-state justice system, to which Galambos was exposed in 1963. By 1964, the idea of restitution-based justice was incorporated firmly into Course V-50. When Alvin Lowi terminated his employment with FEI in 1963, he recommended Jay Stuart Snelson as his substitute. Snelson agreed to lecture for FEI provided the course was amended to incorporate the ideas of LeFevre, Bos, and Estes.
Galambos eventually agreed. His original philosophy, which was undergoing major changes during that period, was modified to incorporate the respective ideas of LeFevre, Bos, and Estes on the disutility of government, the application of the insurance mechanism for protecting property, and a private-based justice system focused on restitution as opposed to incarceration.

Reception
Galambos' idea of according property rights to ideas is controversial. Among the most passionate opponents of this idea are libertarian intellectuals who are aghast at the idea that anyone could limit their access to ideas of others.  However, Galambos' intention was not to limit access to intellectual property, but rather to provide non-coercive systems for compensating creators, including financial and intellectual compensation to the antecedent creators.

Death
In the 1980s, Galambos was diagnosed with Alzheimer's disease. He died on April 10, 1997.

See also
 volition (psychology)
 volition (linguistics)
 integrity
 claim rights and liberty rights
 deontic logic
 law of obligations

Notes

Sources
 .
 .
 .
 Brian Doherty. Radicals for Capitalism: A Freewheeling History of the Modern American Libertarian Movement (2007)

External links
 https://spacelandpublications.com
 The Free Enterprise Institute
 https://www.alvinlowi.net/index.html

1924 births
1997 deaths
Copyright scholars
Hungarian philosophers
Hungarian libertarians
Libertarian theorists
20th-century Hungarian philosophers
Hungarian emigrants to the United States
Carleton College alumni